Gardzienice Drugie  is a village in the administrative district of Gmina Piaski, within Świdnik County, Lublin Voivodeship, in eastern Poland.

The village has a population of 620.

References

Gardzienice Drugie